Chantelle is a suburb of Akasia in Gauteng, South Africa. It is situated to the north west of Pretoria and in the south western corner of Akasia.

It used to be a predominantly Afrikaans speaking suburb for many young white residents, but the demography has changed since the end of apartheid in 1994.

References

Suburbs of Pretoria